Getatagh is a village in the Sisian Municipality of the Syunik Province in Armenia.

History 
The town's church, Saint Astvatsatsin, dates from 1702.

Demographics 
The Statistical Committee of Armenia reported its population as 220 in 2010, up from 194 at the 2001 census.

References 

Populated places in Syunik Province